Konstantin Leonidovich Troyanov (born 18 November 1995) is a Russian football player. He plays for FC Zenit-2 Saint Petersburg.

Club career
He made his professional debut in the Russian Professional Football League for FC Zenit-2 Saint Petersburg on 18 July 2013 in a game against FC Pskov-747 Pskov.

He made his debut for the main squad of FC Zenit Saint Petersburg on 9 December 2015 in the 2015–16 UEFA Champions League group stage game against Gent.

References

1995 births
Footballers from Saint Petersburg
Living people
Russian footballers
Association football midfielders
FC Zenit Saint Petersburg players
FC Shinnik Yaroslavl players
FC Torpedo Moscow players
FC Leningradets Leningrad Oblast players
FC Chayka Peschanokopskoye players
FC Zenit-2 Saint Petersburg players